Micropholis humboldtiana is a species of plant in the family Sapotaceae. It is found in Brazil and Venezuela.

References

humboldtiana
Near threatened plants
Taxonomy articles created by Polbot